is a railway station in Isahaya, Nagasaki Prefecture, Japan. It is operated by JR Kyushu and is on the Nagasaki Main Line.

Lines

Station layout 
The station consists of two side platforms serving two tracks on an embankment. The station building is at street level and is  modern concrete structure with stained glass decorations on the gabled ends. It houses a waiting area and a ticket window. After the ticket gates, an underpass and steps give access to both platforms.

Management of the station has been outsourced to the JR Kyushu Tetsudou Eigyou Co., a wholly owned subsidiary of JR Kyushu specialising in station services. It staffs the ticket window which is equipped with a POS machine but does not have a Midori no Madoguchi facility.

Platforms

Adjacent stations

History
Japanese National Railways (JNR) opened the station on 14 March 1985 as an additional station on the existing track of the Nagasaki Main Line. With the privatization of JNR on 1 April 1987, control of the station passed to JR Kyushu.

Passenger statistics
In fiscal 2016, the station was used by an average of 1,013 passengers daily (boarding passengers only), and it ranked 163rd  among the busiest stations of JR Kyushu.

See also
 List of railway stations in Japan

References

External links
Nishi-Isahaya Station (JR Kyushu)

Railway stations in Nagasaki Prefecture
Nagasaki Main Line
Railway stations in Japan opened in 1985